Coeini is a tribe of brush-footed butterflies. Its members are found in the Neotropical realm.

List of genera 
 Baeotus Hemming, 1939
 Colobura Billberg, 1820
 Historis Hübner, 1819
 Pycina Doubleday, 1849
 Smyrna Hübner, 1823
 Tigridia Hübner, 1819 (sometimes in Nymphalini)

References 

 
Nymphalinae
Butterfly tribes